Tenthredo zonula, a common sawfly, is a species belonging to the family Tenthredinidae subfamily Tenthrediniinae. It is mainly present in France, Germany, Italy, Austria, Switzerland, Poland, Romania, Russia and Greece.

They can be encountered from June through August feeding on flowers (especially on Euphorbia and Apiaceae species). The larvae feed on Hypericum species.

References

 Noël MAGIS - Notes faunistiques sur les espèces du genre Tenthredo Linné, 1758 sensu lato dans larégion Franco-rhénane (Hymenoptera Symphyta : Tenthredinidae, Tenthredininae) - Notes fauniques de Gembloux, n° 53 (2003) : 3-20

External links
 Biolib
 Insect Identification website
 Fsagx.ac.be

Tenthredinidae
Insects described in 1814
Taxa named by Johann Christoph Friedrich Klug
Hymenoptera of Europe